The South Yosemite League is a high school athletic league that is part of the CIF Central Section.  With the exception of Bakersfield Christian High School (a private school), the league consists of public high schools in Bakersfield, California.

 Bakersfield Christian High School
 Ridgeview High School
 Golden Valley High School
 Tehachapi High School
 Independence High School
 West High School

References

CIF Central Section